Mount McConnel is a mountain summit in the Mummy Range of the Rocky Mountains of North America. The summit can be reached via the Mount McConnel National Recreation Trail.

Mountain

See also

List of Colorado mountain ranges
List of Colorado mountain summits
List of Colorado fourteeners
List of Colorado 4000 meter prominent summits
List of the most prominent summits of Colorado
List of Colorado county high points

References

External links

McConnel
McConnel
Roosevelt National Forest
McConnel